Mark Knowles and Daniel Nestor were the defending champions, but Nestor chose not to participate, and only Knowles competed that year.
Knowles partnered with James Blake, but Bob Bryan and Mike Bryan defeated them 6–1, 6–1, in the final.

Seeds

Draw

Draw

External links
Draw

Doubles